The 1999 Three Days of De Panne was the 23rd edition of the Three Days of De Panne cycle race and was held on 30 March to 1 April 1999. The race started in Mouscron and finished in De Panne. The race was won by Peter Van Petegem.

General classification

References

Further reading

Three Days of Bruges–De Panne
1999 in Belgian sport